The Phudagi language, also known as Vadvali, is a language or dialect of the Marathi–Konkani group.
This language is spoken by Panchkalshi and Chaukalshi communities residing in Palghar, Vasai localities.

References

Konkani languages
Southern Indo-Aryan languages